Silvio Henderson Santos de Freitas (born April 10, 1988 in Aracajú), known as Silvio, is a Brazilian footballer who plays as defender or midfielder for Esporte Clube São Luiz.

Career statistics

References

External links

1988 births
Living people
Brazilian footballers
Association football midfielders
Paraná Clube players
Iraty Sport Club players
Londrina Esporte Clube players
Clube Atlético Bragantino players
Ipatinga Futebol Clube players
Esporte Clube São Luiz players
Campeonato Brasileiro Série D players
Campeonato Brasileiro Série C players
Campeonato Brasileiro Série B players